Orhan Kaynak (born 1 March 1970 in Adana), also known as Küçük Orhan, is a retired Turkish footballer best known for his stints in the Turkish Süper Lig with Adanaspor, Trabzonspor, and Kocaelispor.

Professional career
Orhan followed his brothers and graduated from the Adanaspor and joined the first team in the Süper Lig. He spent the rest of his career in the highest divisions of Turkey, with notable performances with Trabzonspor and Kocaelispor.

Coaching career
On 2 March 2018, Kaynak was appointed as the manager of Sarıyer. Kaynak won two games out of ten at Sarıyer. On 12 June 2018, Kaynak was linked with a move to Elazığspor. Later on the month, he was officially announced as the club's new manager. After seven months, on 24 January 2019, Kaynak decided to resign from Elazığspor. The club was in a very bad economical condition and had a debt of 46 million turkish lira, also with 12 players leaving the club. 

A few days later, on 28 January 2019, Kaynak was announced as the new manager of Boluspor.

Personal life
Orhan was born in to a large family of 8 children. His brothers Reşit, Kayhan, İrfan, İlhan and Ayhan were all professional footballers. He earned the nickname "Küçük Orhan" (meaning little Orhan), because Orhan Çıkırıkçı was in the same team at Trabzonspor.

Honours
Adanaspor
 TFF First League: 1987-88

Samsunspor
 TFF First League: 1992-93

Trabzonspor
 Turkish Cup: 1994-95
 Turkish Super Cup: 1995

Beşiktaş
 TSYD Cup: 1996-97

References

External links
 
  (as coach)
 
 

1970 births
Living people
People from Adana
Turkish footballers
Turkey youth international footballers
Adanaspor footballers
Samsunspor footballers
Trabzonspor footballers
Beşiktaş J.K. footballers
Kocaelispor footballers
Xanthi F.C. players
İstanbul Başakşehir F.K. players
Kayseri Erciyesspor footballers
Akçaabat Sebatspor footballers
Sarıyer S.K. footballers
Süper Lig players
TFF First League players
Super League Greece players
Turkish expatriate footballers
Expatriate footballers in Greece
Turkish expatriate sportspeople in Greece
Association football forwards